Co-enrollment is an instructional approach that brings deaf or hard of hearing students and hearing students together in a classroom. It is distinguished from mainstreaming approaches in several ways and more closely follows bilingual and dual language education practice and goals. In the 1960s and 1970s, many schools for the deaf in Scandinavia moved from an oral approach to a bilingual model. During the 1980s, many schools for the deaf in the United States began implementing bilingual curriculum under a bilingual-bicultural education model. During the 1980s and 1990s, this model was widely adopted around the globe. Co-enrollment extends the bilingual educational approach to include hearing students as well, with varying emphasis on Deaf culture. Programs following this model provide all students with access to signed, spoken and written language.

Criteria 
Each site has a unique approach, but will implement some combination of the following criteria

All students are taught in the regional sign language at least part of the day
Deaf and hearing teachers and staff work together either in the same classroom or the same school
Co-teaching model
Discrete language times or classrooms model
Minority language is used when students are together
Sign language literacy is included in the instructional day
Siblings of deaf children or CODAs are given priority for enrollment
All students, regardless of hearing status, are encouraged to become bilingual in written language, sign language and spoken language (the latter may be de-emphasized for some deaf students).
Use of classroom interpreters occurs infrequently (especially in younger grades)

Benefits 
Co-enrollment programs seek to fill gaps in special schools and mainstream programs. Like in special schools, Deaf role models and sign language are given a key role in the educational day. They also wish to take advantage of the academic standards found in mainstream settings. Families are encouraged to learn sign together and deaf and hearing students learn how to advocate for each other and think about inclusion in both academic and social contexts.

Drawbacks 
There are few studies that have been conducted on co-enrollment schools, though early works indicate that deaf students establish a greater sense of self than in mainstream settings, and that hearing students are more likely to include the deaf students in social aspects of the school day.

References 

Yiu, K. C., & Tang, G. (2014). Social Integration of Deaf and Hard-of-Hearing Students in a Sign Bilingual and Co-enrollment Environment. Bilingualism and Bilingual Deaf Education, 342-367. doi:10.1093/acprof:oso/9780199371815.003.0014
Antia, S., & Metz, K. K. (2014). Co-enrollment in the United States. Bilingualism and Bilingual Deaf Education, 424-442. doi:10.1093/acprof:oso/9780199371815.003.0017
Kirchner, C. J. (1994). Co-enrollment As an Inclusion Model. American Annals of the Deaf, 139(2b), 163-164. doi:10.1353/aad.2012.0187

External links 
 

Deaf culture